Jonas Frögren (born August 28, 1980) is a Swedish former professional ice hockey player who last played for Leksands IF in the Swedish Swedish Hockey League (SHL).

Playing career
Frögren was drafted by the Calgary Flames in the 1998 NHL Entry Draft in the 8th round as the 206th pick overall.

Frögren came to Färjestads BK as a junior in the mid 1990s and played seven seasons with Färjestads BK, having won two Swedish Championships and four Swedish Championship silver medals.

On July 9, 2008, Frögren signed a two-year contract with the Toronto Maple Leafs of the NHL.  However, the contract Frögren signed was rejected by the NHL due to a dispute over his status.  While the League believed he was an entry level player (as he was drafted by the Calgary Flames in 1998 but did not sign with them), the Leafs and Frögren's agent, Don Meehan, believed he was an unrestricted free agent, thus signing him to a contract worth more than the $875,000 limit that was mandated by the NHL for entry level players.

Frögren scored his first NHL goal on December 20, 2008 against Marc-André Fleury of the Pittsburgh Penguins.

On April 1, 2009, the NHL came to a decision on the discipline of the handling of Frögren's contract. The Maple Leafs were fined $500,000 for paying Frögren the original contract, which included a $755,000 signing bonus. It is believed that Frögren used approximately $400,000 of his signing bonus to get out of the final year of his contract with Färjestad.  The Maple Leafs were also forced to forfeit their 2009 fourth round draft pick (previously acquired from the Carolina Hurricanes via the Tampa Bay Lightning at the 2009 NHL Trade Deadline). Neither Frögren's salary nor contractual status were affected by the NHL's decision.

On April 21, 2010, Frögren returned to Färjestads BK signing a four-year contract. Upon completion of the second year of his contract with Färjestads, Frogen sought a release from his contract to join the Kontinental Hockey League with HC Dinamo Minsk and Atlant Moscow Oblast in the 2012–13 season.

After returning to Sweden and playing the 2013–14 season with Skellefteå AIK, and providing a veteran presence on the Blueline in claiming the Championship, Frogren left as a free agent to be closer to family in signing a one-year contract in Leksands IF on May 9, 2014. Frogren announced his retirement from active play on April 27, 2016, as Captain of Leksands IF.

Awards
 Swedish Champion with Färjestads BK in 2002, 2006, and 2011 and with Skellefteå AIK in 2014.

Career statistics

Regular season and playoffs

International

References

External links

1980 births
Atlant Moscow Oblast players
Bofors IK players
Calgary Flames draft picks
Färjestad BK players
HC Dinamo Minsk players
Leksands IF players
Living people
Skellefteå AIK players
Swedish ice hockey defencemen
Swedish expatriate ice hockey players in Canada
Toronto Maple Leafs players
Toronto Marlies players
People from Falun
Sportspeople from Dalarna County